The Brits Who Built the Modern World is a British factual television series that was first broadcast on BBC Four from 13 to 27 February 2014. The three-part series tells the story of British architects Richard Rogers, Norman Foster, Nicholas Grimshaw, Michael Hopkins and Terry Farrell.

Production
The series was produced with the Open University and a Royal Institute of British Architects exhibition (which also included Lady Patty Hopkins). The exhibition was open between 13 February and 27 May 2014.

Episode list

Controversy
The series was the subject of controversy when the BBC were accused of removing Patty Hopkins from a photograph of the architects, used to illustrate the third programme of the series. Patty Hopkins had been a full partner in the Hopkins company from the outset. The BBC were accused of ignoring women architects, though the BBC responded by saying that at the start of making the series, the director met with both Michael and Patricia Hopkins to discuss their involvement in the series.

References

External links
 
 
 

2014 British television series debuts
2014 British television series endings
2010s British documentary television series
BBC television documentaries
Documentary television series about architecture
Documentary television series about technology
English-language television shows
Modernist architects from the United Kingdom
Norman Foster, Baron Foster of Thames Bank
Richard Rogers
Television shows set in the United Kingdom
Television shows about British architecture
Television series about the history of the United Kingdom